The 1981 Arizona State Sun Devils football team was an American football team that represented Arizona State University in the Pacific-10 Conference (Pac-10) during the 1981 NCAA Division I-A football season. In their second season under head coach Darryl Rogers, the Sun Devils compiled a 9–2 record (5–2 against Pac-10 opponents), finished in a tie for second place in the Pac-10, and outscored their opponents by a combined total of 394 to 193.

The team's statistical leaders included Mike Pagel with 2,484 passing yards, Gerald Riggs with 891 rushing yards and Bernard Henry with 647 receiving yards.

The team was on probation, making them ineligible for a bowl game.

Schedule

Personnel

References

Arizona State
Arizona State Sun Devils football seasons
Arizona State Sun Devils football